The Lambda Literary Publishing Professional Award, established in 2016, "honors a distinguished individual in the lesbian, gay, bisexual and transgender community whose innovative work in the publishing industry promotes and promulgates LGBTQ literature."

Recipients

References 

Awards established in 2016
Lambda Literary Awards
English-language literary awards
Lists of LGBT-related award winners and nominees